The People Mover in Venice is an automated elevated shuttle train, which connects the Piazzale Roma—the major transportation hub of the city—and the Tronchetto island with a car parking facility. The train also makes a stop at the Marittima station where the passenger terminal of the Port of Venice is located.

Venice's People Mover is a small-scale automated guideway public transit system—a people mover.

Description
The system's two four-car trains are pulled by a cable similar to a funicular, but with shallow gradients track: 
it reaches a maximum of 6.2% at the section crossing the Tronchetto channel, and is less than 5% over the rest of the track.
Each of the two trains can accommodate 200 passengers.

The line was built by a consortium led by the Austrian company Doppelmayr Cable Car. 
It was the fifth Cable Liner shuttle system installed by the Doppelmayr Garaventa Group.

The whole  journey takes just over three minutes, including the stop next to the cruise ship terminal. The rail gauge is 1220 mm, difference in altitude between terminal stations 0.58 m.

In mid-2019, the fare was €1.50. Passengers who already have an unused ACTV land-bus ticket can validate that instead of paying the fare to ride the People Mover.

Gallery

References

2010 establishments in Italy
Cable car railways in Italy
Transport in Venice
Public transport in Italy
Urban people mover systems
People mover systems in Italy
Articles containing video clips